Helicon or Helikon may refer to

Places
Helicon (river), a former river in the Macedonian city Dion, mentioned in Greek mythology
Mount Helicon, mountain in Boeotia, Greece
"Helikon", an 1893 mansion designed by Charles Slayter in Strathfield, New South Wales
Helikon Park, a park in Randfontein Local Municipality, West Rand District Municipality, Gauteng, South Africa
Torre Helicon, the fourth tallest building in Monterrey, Mexico
Helicon Home Colony, an experimental community formed by author Upton Sinclair in Englewood, New Jersey
Fictional planet in the Arcturus sector where Hari Seldon was born in the Foundation series of Isaac Asimov

Arts and entertainment

Music
Helicon (instrument), a brass musical instrument in the tuba family
Helicon Mountain, studio of Jools Holland
Helicon, a 1977 album by The Four Seasons
Helicon Records, a record label founded in Israel in 1985
"New Paths to Helicon, Pt. 1" and "New Paths to Helicon, Pt. 2", songs by the Scottish post-rock band Mogwai
Helikon, a 1952 piano concerto by Mikis Theodorakis
Helikon Opera, a Moscow-based opera company

Other uses in arts and entertainment
Englands Helicon, an anthology of Elizabethan pastoral poems published in 1600
Heliconian Club, Toronto women's arts society

Science and technology

Software
Helicon Filter, a photo editing program
Helicon Photo Safe, a digital image organization tool
Helicon Ape, an ASP.NET module to introduce Apache functionality on IIS web servers

Other uses in science and technology
Helicon (crater), a lunar impact crater
Helicon (physics), low frequency electromagnetic waves
Helikon vortex separation process, used for uranium enrichment
Helicon Double Layer Thruster, a prototype spacecraft propulsion engine
Helicon engine, a motorcycle engine that powers the Buell 1125R and 1125CR

See also
Heliconiinae or Heliconians, a subfamily of butterflies
Heliconia, a plant genus